Ḥasan bar Bahlul was a 10th-century Christian bishop and Syriac linguist.

Not much is known of Bar Bahlul's life. His name has appeared in the list of bishops who supported Abdisho I's ascent to the patriarchy of the Church of the East in 963.

Bar Bahlul is mainly known for his comprehensive Syriac-Arabic dictionary. He has also a number of other books that were lost on the biographies of Western and Eastern Syriac bishops and on the interpretation of dreams.
Something that has brought Bar Bahlul to attention is his claim that the modern day Syriacs and 'Assyrians' were formerly called 'Arameans'.

External links 
 Dukhrana online searchable version of Hassan bar Bahlul's Syriac Lexicon: VOLUME 1 & 2

References 

10th-century bishops of the Church of the East
Medieval linguists
10th-century lexicographers